Lymantria umbrifera is a moth in the subfamily Lymantriinae first described by Wileman in 1910. It is found in Taiwan and China.

The wingspan is 32–50 mm. Adults are on wing in February and May.

References

Moths described in 1910
Lymantria